Nicholas Christopher Milton  (born 1967 in Sydney) is an Australian conductor and violinist.

Career
Milton studied violin with Gillian McIntyre, Robert Pikler and Harry Curby, graduating from the Sydney Conservatorium of Music.  He accepted a scholarship at Michigan State University, where he studied violin, conducting, music theory, and Eastern philosophy. He lectured at Boston University and the Juilliard School, and was artist-in-residence at the City University of New York.

Milton is known for his work as chief conductor of the Canberra Symphony Orchestra and Willoughby Symphony in Australia, and the Orchestra of the State Theater of Saarland (Saarländischen Staatstheater) in Germany. He is Permanent Guest Conductor of the Zagreb Philharmonic Orchestra and is principal conductor of the Croatian Chamber Orchestra. Since 2018 he has been Artistic Director and Chief Conductor of the Göttinger Symphonie Orchester.

Prior to his career as a conductor, Milton was concertmaster of the Adelaide Symphony Orchestra and violinist for the Macquarie Trio, performing with pianist Kathryn Selby.

Awards and honours
Milton's awards include the Queen Elizabeth Silver Jubilee Award, the New York Master's Award in Conducting, and the Gold Medal from the Sleider International Violin Competition.

Milton won the 1999 Symphony Australia Conductor of the Year Competition and was a prize-winner in the Lovro von Matačić International Competition of Young Conductors.
In 2001 he was awarded the Centenary Medal, "For service to Australian society and the advancement of music". Milton won the 1999 Symphony Australia Conductor of the Year Competition and was a prize-winner in the Lovro von Matačić International Competition of Young Conductors. He also received the 2014-15 College of Music Distinguished Alumni Award from Michigan State University. In 2015, he was invited by the Australian Prime Minister to join the Australia-Germany Advisory Group.
In 2016 he was appointed a Member of the Order of Australia (AM), "for significant service to the arts, particularly to classical orchestral music performance, as a musician, conductor and artistic director".

Milton was nominated for a 2016 Grammy Award in the category, Best Classical Instrumental Solo, for his recording with Joseph Moog of Piano Concertos by Grieg and Moszkowski.

Personal
Milton has three brothers and all studied violin with Gillian McIntyre.

External links
Nicholas Milton website

References

Living people
1968 births
Australian classical violinists
Male classical violinists
Australian conductors (music)
Concertmasters
Sydney Conservatorium of Music alumni
Juilliard School faculty
Boston University faculty
Members of the Order of Australia
Recipients of the Centenary Medal
21st-century conductors (music)
21st-century classical violinists
21st-century Australian male musicians
21st-century Australian musicians